Rahul 

Jagaluru is a panchayat town in Davanagere district in the Indian state of Karnataka.

Geography
It has an average elevation of 668 metres (2191 feet). Rangayyanadurga forest of this taluk is a house for four horned-antelope an endangered species in India.People say that Jagalur has got its name by a sage named Jagalurajja . Imam Sab, who served as an education minister in the period of Maharaja of Mysore Sri Krisnaraja wodeyer IV, has done memorable services for the development of Jagalur.

References

Cities and towns in Davanagere district